The FAI Cup 1932/33 was the twelfth edition of Ireland's premier cup competition, The Football Association of Ireland Challenge Cup or FAI Cup. The tournament began on 26 December 1932 and concluded on 26 March 1933 with the final replay held at Dalymount Park, Dublin. An official attendance of 18,000 people watched Shamrock Rovers claim their fifth FAI Cup title in a row by defeating Dolphin.

First round

Second round

Semi-finals

Final

Replay

Notes
A.  From 1923-1936, the FAI Cup was known as the Free State Cup.

B.  Attendances were calculated using gate receipts which limited their accuracy as a large proportion of people, particularly children, attended football matches in Ireland throughout the 20th century for free by a number of means.

C.  Fixture abandoned after 38 minutes. Re-Fixture played on 11 January.

References
General

External links
FAI Website

1932-33
1932–33 in Irish association football
FAI Cup